Macledium is a genus of flowering plants in the daisy family. Both Macledium and Dicoma are distributed largely in tropical and southern Africa. Macledium is distinguished from genus Dicoma by a large number of characters relating to morphology and anatomy of phyllaries, corolla, anthers, style, cypsela and testa.

The genus contains some 20 species. In southern Africa it is informally divided into the Cape and grassland groups:
Cape species: 
M. latifolium
M. relhanioides
M. spinosum
Grassland species: 
M. pretoriense
M. sessiliflorum subsp. sessiliflorum var. membranaceum 
M. speciosum 
M. zeyheri

References

Asteraceae genera